Maharakshak: Devi is an Indian superhero children's television series that premiered on Zee TV on 14 March 2015.

Plot
The series follows the story of Gauri, who is an incarnation of the Hindu Goddess Devi/Durga. During the first 17 years of her life, Gauri is raised and trained by her Guru, Brihaspati, who found her floating in the river when she was an infant. She eventually battles various asuras that exist in the contemporary world (Bhasmasura, Kumbhakarna, Mahishasura, Jalandhara, Raktabīja and Sumbha and Nisumbha) under the service of their Guru, Shukracharya. Her companions and advisors are Brihaspati, Tiger, Parijaat, Inspector Narayan, and Krishna.

Cast
 Umang Jain as Gauri/Devi/Durga
 Rohit Bakshi as Brihaspati/Professor Jayant
 Indraneil Sengupta as Shukracharya/Virat Mittal
 Karan Suchak as Inspector Narayan/Narada
 Shresth Kumar as Krishna
Sahil Uppal as Tiger
 Ankit Gera as Bhasma/Bhasmasura
 Varun Kapoor as Mahish/Mahishasura
 Rushiraj Pawar as Parijaat
 Nikita Sharma as Vedika
Kamalika Guha Thakurta as Meena
 Ujjawal Gauraha as Jalandhar
Tarun Khanna as Raktabija

Development
In response to a perceived lack of superheroes in Indian films, Zee TV launched its Maharakshak superhero franchise in 2014 with the three-month serial, Maharakshak: Aryan. It was followed in 2015 with the second installment, the three month series, Maharakshak: Devi (while the network originally planned for the franchise to consist of three series, only two have been released to date). Maharakshak: Devi was conceived of as a vehicle to highlight female empowerment. Umang Jain was cast in the dual roles of Gauri/Devi, partly due to her background as a dancer and a brown belt in the martial arts. Jain states that she was drawn to the role because it was a challenging one.

References

External links

2015 Indian television series debuts
Child superheroes
Female characters in television
Female superheroes
Fictional women soldiers and warriors
Hindi-language television shows
Hindu mythology in popular culture
Indian fantasy television series
Indian superhero television shows
Television shows about reincarnation
Science fantasy television series
Zee TV original programming
Krishna in popular culture